Mowrey Beach is an organized hamlet within the Rural Municipality (RM) of Mervin No. 499 in the Canadian province of Saskatchewan.

Government 
While Mowrey Beach is under the jurisdiction of the RM of Mervin No. 499, it has a three-person hamlet board.

References

External links 

 

Mervin No. 499, Saskatchewan
Division No. 17, Saskatchewan
Organized hamlets in Saskatchewan